Dawid Kamrowski (born 12 March 1983) is a Polish footballer (Midfielder) released free from Unia Janikowo in the winter break 2006/2007 . His former club was MAS Pierikós Kateríni (Greece)

Clubs 
 2002-2005  Pogoń Szczecin (most time in the reserve team)
 2005 -  Śląsk Wrocław
 2006 -  MAS Pierikós Kateríni
 2006 -  Unia Janikowo

External links
 

1983 births
Living people
Polish footballers
Unia Janikowo players
Sportspeople from Szczecin
Association football midfielders